Titanoptilus serrulatus is a moth of the family Pterophoridae. It is known from Africa.The scientific name of this species was first validly published in 1935.

References

Pterophorinae
Moths described in 1935
Taxa named by Edward Meyrick
Moths of Africa